Eugenio Bava (4 June 1886, Italy – 23 October 1966, Rome, Italy) was an Italian film cinematographer.

His son was film director Mario Bava and his grandson is Italian horror film director Lamberto Bava.

Selected filmography
 Cabiria (1914)
 Black Shirt (1933)

References

External links

 Mario and Eugenio Bava Biography at Images Journal

1886 births
1966 deaths
Italian cinematographers